The 1992 Tajikistan protests, also known as the Tajikistani Revolution, were nonviolent, bloodless protests and demonstrations against the results of the 1991 Tajik presidential election. These results were thought to be rigged and in favour of the president Rahmon Nabiyev. Opposition rallies erupted on 26 March 1992 but demonstrations became large-scale by May, at the onset of violence. These series of peaceful protests would lead to the bloody Tajikistani Civil War.

Background 
Tajikistan was part of the Soviet Union as the Tajik SSR. It was not struggling until the perestroika and glasnost policies was set in place by Mikhail Gorbachev, last president of the USSR, which made Tajik life struggle. Since then, Tajikistan has been arguing and complaining over the Situation. In 1990, the 1990 Dushanbe riots was taking place against Armenia and the government. Independence arrived, with Tajikistan being an independent nation. A Large-scale peaceful opposition uprising was held after the August coup, in which Moscow forces led an insurrection against Mikhail Gorbachev. These events took place before the 1991 Tajik presidential election.

Protests 
Protests surrounding the election results escalated in March, with clashes but they soon subsided. Quiet Revolutionary protests and small anti-govt demonstrations took place in April, after March's protests. Mass strikes and major demonstrations re-erupted throughout the country against the government, demanding the resignation of the government and the president, Rahmon Nabiyev. Soon, firearms was armed with pro-government militants, and soon starting to quell the crowds in town squares with the firearms and tanks, sparking more anger. Angry protesters threw stones and these peaceful street protests turned into a violent crackdown and battleground. The unrest spiralled out of control, with others struggling to contain the anger and demands for new elections in cities. These protesters started to clash in Khujand, Tajikistan's second-largest city, sparking the 5 year long Tajikistani Civil War. After weeks of a new wave of mass strikes and anti-government demonstrations, the protesters captured the president and forced him to resign.

See also  
 Rahmon Nabiyev
 Tajikistani Civil War

References 

1992 in Tajikistan
1992 protests
Protests in Tajikistan
Protests against results of elections
Demonstrations
Protest marches